Hemignathini is a formerly-recognized tribe of Hawaiian honeycreepers containing the ʻalauahios, the extinct ʻakialoas, ʻamakihis, and extinct nukupuʻus.

Genera and species

Genus Aidemedia - straight thin bills, insectivorous
 Oʻahu icterid-like gaper (Aidemedia chascax) - prehistoric
 Sickle-billed gaper (Aidemedia zanclops) - prehistoric
 Maui Nui icterid-like gaper (Aidemedia lutetiae) - prehistoric
Genus Akialoa - pointed or long and down-curved bills, insectivorous or nectarivorous
Lesser ʻakialoa (Akialoa obscura) - extinct (1940)
Oʻahu ʻakialoa (Akialoa ellisiana) - extinct (1940)
Maui Nui ʻakialoa (Akialoa lanaiensis) - extinct (1892)
Kauaʻi ʻakialoa (Akialoa stejnegeri) - extinct (1969)
Hoopoe-billed ʻakialoa (Akialoa upupirostris) - prehistoric
Genus Chlorodrepanis - pointed bills, insectivorous and nectarivorous
Hawaiʻi ʻamakihi (Chlorodrepanis virens)
Oʻahu ʻamakihi (Chlorodrepanis flava)
Kauaʻi ʻamakihi (Chlorodrepanis stejnegeri)
Genus Hemignathus - pointed or long and down-curved bills, insectivorous
Giant nukupuʻu (Hemignathus vorpalis) - prehistoric
Maui nukupuʻu (Hemignathus affinis) extinct (1995–1998)
Oahu nukupuʻu (Hemignathus lucidus) extinct (1837)
Kauai nukupuʻu (Hemignathus hanapepe) extinct (1998)
ʻAkiapolaʻau (Hemignathus wilsoni)
Genus Loxops - small pointed bills with the tips offset a little horizontally, insectivores
Hawaiʻi creeper (Loxops mana)
ʻAkekeʻe (Loxops caeruleirostris)
Hawaiʻi ʻakepa (Loxops coccineus)
Maui ʻakepa (Loxops ochraceus) - extinct (1988)
Oʻahu ʻakepa (Loxops  wolstenholmei) - extinct (1990s)
Genus Magumma - small pointed bills, insectivorous and nectarivorous
ʻAnianiau (Magumma parva)
Genus Oreomystis - short pointed bills, insectivorous
ʻAkikiki (Oreomystis bairdi)
Genus Paroreomyza -  short pointed bills, insectivorous
Maui Nui ʻalauahio (Paroreomyza montana newtoni)
Lanaʻi ʻalauahio (Paroreomyza montana montana) - extinct (1937)
Kakawahie (Paroreomyza flammea) - extinct (1963)
Oʻahu ʻalauahio (Paroreomyza maculata) - possibly extinct (early 1990s?)
Genus Vangulifer - flat rounded bills, possibly caught flying insects
 Strange-billed finch (Vangulifer mirandus) - prehistoric
 Thin-billed finch (Vangulifer neophasis) - prehistoric
Genus Viridonia
Greater ʻamakihi (Viridonia sagittirostris) - extinct (1901)

See also
Hawaiian honeycreeper, which includes all the species of Hawaiian honeycreepers

References 

Bird tribes
Carduelinae
Endemic fauna of Hawaii
Higher-level bird taxa restricted to the Australasia-Pacific region